The Omkareshwar Dam is a gravity dam on the Narmada River just upstream of Mandhata in Khandwa district, Madhya Pradesh, India. It is named after the Omkareshwar temple located just downstream. An associated hydroelectric power station located at the base of the dam has an installed capacity of 520 MW.

References

Dams in Madhya Pradesh
Tourist attractions in Khandwa district
Hydroelectric power stations in Madhya Pradesh
Dams on the Narmada River
Gravity dams
Dams completed in 2007
Energy infrastructure completed in 2007
2007 establishments in Madhya Pradesh